Gettys is an anglicised Irish-language surname, a variant of Getty.  Notable people with the surname include:

Jim Gettys (born 1953), American computer programmer
Michael Gettys (born 1995), American baseball player
Reid Gettys (born 1963), American basketball player and lawyer
Samuel Gettys (fl. 1780s), American settler and tavern owner, founder of Gettysburg, Pennsylvania
Thomas S. Gettys (1912–2003), American politician, U.S. Representative from South Carolina

Anglicised Irish-language surnames